Marad is an ancient Sumerian city in modern-day Iraq.

Marad also may refer to:

Marad Beach a village in Kerala, India
Marad massacre, a 2003 religious charged killing of eight people in Kerala, India
 MARAD, the United States Maritime Administration
 Mārad, or Mared, a village in Khuzestan Province, Iran

See also
 
 Mared (disambiguation)
 Maradi (disambiguation)
 Marda (disambiguation)